Chennu Nalike is an ancient traditional folk art form practised by Tulu people from the region of Tulu Nadu, India. It normally comes in the months of February and March.

Mera community
Mera (also known as Moger in Tulu and Mogera in Kannada), is a community of Tulu Nadu, India, an indigenous people mainly spread in the areas of modern Kasaragod District of Kerala and Mangalore, Udupi, Coorg Districts of Karnataka. They follow a matriarchal family system called as "Bari". The Language spoken by Meras' is Tulu.

Nalike
This  kind of dance called nalike, performed by Mera community of Dakshina Kannada. It starts with Suggi Punnam and lasts for three to nine days as per head of community decided on there meeting.

Paddanas Song

Ritual costumes
It has two characters that are Chennu and Koraga. Chennu has dress of woman with Sampige flower on head. It is performed in night. Men and women help in background music. They sing Paddanas.

Belief
If they come face-to-face clash will arise.

References 

Indian folk dances
Ritual dances
Culture of Karnataka
Culture of Tulu Nadu